Blastobasis transcripta is a moth in the family Blastobasidae. It is found in India.

The larvae have been recorded feeding within the twigs of Pinus longifolia.

References

Moths described in 1918
Blastobasis
Moths of Asia